Kavvayi Backwaters located near Payyanur is the third largest backwater in Kerala and the largest one in north Kerala. The Kavvayi Kayal (backwaters) is dotted with several small and large islands.

Islands of Kavvayi backwaters
 Kavvayi
 Valiyaparamba
 Padannakkadappuram
 Vadakkekkadu
 Kokkal
 Edayilakkad
 Madakkal
 Kannuveed
 Kavvayikkadappuram
 Udumbanthala
 Kochen
 Vadakkumbad

Geography

The Kavvayi Backwater, located near Payyannur, is the third largest backwaters in Kerala and the largest one in north Kerala.  Locally called as Kavvayi Kayal or the backwaters of Kavvayi, this lesser known lake of northern Kerala is fed by five rivers viz. River Kavvayi and its tributary streams Kankol, Vannathichal, Kuppithodu, and Kuniyan. Kavvayi backwaters is named after the Kavvayi Islands close to Payyannur. Kavvayi used to be an inland port and a major administrative center during the past centuries and during British East India Company rule.

The northern portion of Kavvayi lake is also known as Valiyaparamba backwaters. This Island has a population of 10,000. The island's main source of income come from agriculture and fishing.  A secluded beach named Valiparamba beach runs parallel to the backwaters on its western side.

From an ecological point of view the backwater of Kavvayi and its surrounding region is considered to be of significance. The Kavvayi backwater is the biggest wetland ecosystem in north Kerala with an area of 37 km2. The backwater and the wetlands are home to a variety of fauna and flora. It is used for watership man training by Indian Naval Academy, Ezhimala.

Valiyaparamba is one of the main tourist spots of the Kasaragod district and is also a fishing centre.

Kavvayi 3 km from Payyanur
Ramanthali 6 km from Payyanur
Trikarpur 7 km from Payyanur
Kunhimangalam Village 8 km from Payyanur
Karivellur 10 km from Payyanur
Ezhimala 12 km from Payyanur
Peringome 20 km from Payyanur

Transportation
There is bus and jeep service to Payyanur town.
The national highway passes through Perumba junction. Goa and Mumbai can be accessed on the northern side and Cochin and Thiruvananthapuram can be accessed on the southern side. The road to the east of Iritty connects to Mysore and Bangalore. The nearest railway station is Payyanur on Mangalore-Palakkad line. 
Trains are available to almost all parts of India subject to advance booking over the internet.  There are airports at Kannur, Mangalore and Calicut. All of them are international airports but direct flights are available only to Middle Eastern countries.

See also

Kavvayi

References

Islands of the Indian Ocean
Islands of Kerala
Lakes of Kerala
Villages near Payyanur
Islands of India
Populated places in India